Eva Belaise (15 January 1927 – 28 June 2008) was an Italian swimmer. She competed in the women's 4 × 100 metre freestyle relay at the 1952 Summer Olympics.

References

External links
 

1927 births
2008 deaths
Olympic swimmers of Italy
Swimmers at the 1952 Summer Olympics
Sportspeople from Trento
Italian female freestyle swimmers